is a Japanese actress, model, dancer, lyricist and singer. She is best known for her memorable role of Makimachi Misao in the movie series Rurouni Kenshin, as Mai Nakahara in The 8-Year Engagement, Koharu in The Cinderella Addiction and most recently as Yuzuha Usagi in Netflix's Alice in Borderland. Her older sister, Honoka, works as a model, while her younger brother, Shimba Tsuchiya, is also an actor.

Career and Stage Play
Chosen from among 2,020 women auditioning for the part, Tsuchiya was cast in the starring role of Mare, a morning drama serial aired on Japan's public television which first aired on March 30, 2015.

In 2018, Tsuchiya performed in a theatre production in five cities within four countries around the world. The production was an adaptation from the manga Pluto. She played two main characters: a little cyborg girl named Uran and a cyborg woman named Helena.

She planned to participate in another Stage Play challenge in Tokyo during the summer of 2020, joining a Madam Mari Natsuki production called Neo Vol. 4.

Personal life 
On January 1, 2023, Tsuchiya announced on her Instagram that she had married Generations from Exile Tribe vocalist Ryota Katayose. At the same time, she also announced her pregnancy with her first child.

Filmography

Film

Television

TV anime
 Erased (2016) – 10-year-old Satoru Fujinuma

Anime film
 Sing a Bit of Harmony (2021) – Shion Ashimori

Japanese dubbing
Live-action
 Bumblebee (2018) – Charlie Watson (Hailee Steinfeld)
Animation
 Ballerina (2016) – Félicie

Music video
 Sia – Alive (2016)
 Greeeen – Dream (2016)
 Lang Lang – Classical Music Mashup (2019)
 Taiking ft. Tsuchiya Tao -  Rules (2022)

Others
60th Japan Record Awards (2018), host
61st Japan Record Awards (2019), host

Discography

Singles 
 "Fēlicies" (2017)
 "Anniversary" (2018) released as Taotak (duo with Takumi Kitamura)
 " Lead Your Partner " (2021)
 "Umbrella" (2021)
 "You Got Friends" (2021)
 "Rules" (2022) (featuring with Taiking of Suchmos )

Print publications

Magazines
 Hanachu, Shufunotomo 2003-, as an exclusive model from May 2008 to June 2010

Photobooks
 Tsubomi 1 (13 October 2011, Magazine House) 
 Document (3 February 2015, Tokyo News Service) 
 Marezora (16 September 2015, NHK Publishing)

Awards

References

External links

Tao Tsuchiya at Sony Music

1995 births
Living people
Actresses from Tokyo
21st-century Japanese actresses
Japanese female models
Asadora lead actors
Models from Tokyo Metropolis
Japanese film actresses
Japanese television actresses
Singers from Tokyo
21st-century Japanese women singers